The Minsk Governorate or Government of Minsk was a governorate (guberniya) of the Russian Empire. The seat was in Minsk. It was created in 1793 from the land acquired in the partitions of Poland and lasted until 1921.

Administrative structure

Bobruysky Uyezd
Borisovsky Uyezd
Igumensky Uyezd
Minsky Uyezd
Mozyrsky Uyezd
Novogrudsky Uyezd (part of Grodno Governorate before 1843)
Pinsky Uyezd
Rechitsky Uyezd
Slutsky Uyezd

Vileysky and Disnensky Uyezds passed to the Vilna Governorate in 1843. In 1919, Baranovichsky Uyezd was created from Novogorodoksky Uyezd and Nesvizhsky Uyezd was created from Slutsky Uyezd. In 1920, Novogrudoksky, Pinsky, Baranovichsky, and Nesvizhsky Uyezds were controlled by Poland.

Demographics

Industry

Minsk province has mostly swampy terrain and clay soil, but the climate is favorable for agriculture. Flax and hemp were planted for home use.

Horticulture is common everywhere, primarily in the form of subsistence farming. In the city of Minsk, horticulture is mainly done by Tatars, in Bobruysk by Old Believers. Horticulture spread everywhere, but it was not lacking in industrial character, it is a special property of every household, starting with a peasant and ending with a rich landowner. One feature of horticulture in the Minsk provinces was that each gardener tried to grow as many different fruit trees as possible. Since horticulture was not of an industrial nature, fruits were imported from Little Russia.

Beekeeping was spread throughout the province, although it was not of an industrial nature. In 1897, there were 11,740 beekeepers.

Forestry, which was exclusively practiced by Jews, played a significant role.

Cattle breeding and sheep breeding was widespread throughout the province.

Factory and similar industry is limited only to the needs of its own province. In 1860, there were 594 factories and plants; in 1879 — 623; in 1895 — 378; in 1912 — 493.

In 1912, there were 61,485 artisans, 20,842 of them in cities.

Governors

References

Further reading

External links
Minsk Gubernia

 
1793 establishments in the Russian Empire
1921 disestablishments in Russia
Former subdivisions of Belarus
States and territories established in 1793
States and territories disestablished in 1921
Governorates of the Russian Empire
Governorates of the Russian Soviet Federative Socialist Republic